The Excelsior Hotel Ernst with a view of Cologne Cathedral, the Dom, was built in 1863. Carl Ernst was the constructor and first owner of the hotel, which was formerly called "Hotel Ernst". The Beggar from Cologne Cathedral

A large part of the plot of the film " The Beggar of Cologne Cathedral" (silent film of 1927) plays in Cologne Hotel Excelsior, which is recognizable by the film recordings as a Hotel Excelsior Ernst.

History 
Eight years later, in 1871, Carl Ernst sold the hotel to Friedrich Kracht. Four years after buying the hotel, Kracht died and his wife and son, Carl Kracht, had to manage the Innenstadt hotel. Meanwhile, the hotel had become part of Cologne's better society, and in 1884, Carl Kracht was appointed Prince of the Cologne Carnival - a big honor in Cologne. From early times, the hotel had famous guests, such as German Emperor William I and American artist Andy Warhol. 

In 1889, Carl Kracht married Emma Pauline Baur of the Swiss Hoteliers family Baur, who owned both the famous Hotel Baur au Lac and the Savoy Baur en Ville. Carl Kracht and his family lived in Zurich and he managed the Hotel Baur au Lac. After his wedding, he appointed a general manager to take care of the Hotel Ernst's operations. 

From 1908 to 1910 the Hotel Ernst was rebuilt and re-opened as Grand-Hotel Excelsior Hotel Ernst with at the time unparalleled comfort: 100 rooms out of 250 had a private bathroom. In 1918, after World War I, the British Army moved into the hotel and used it as their headquarters during the occupation of the Rhineland. On 31 December 1926 Excelsior Hotel Ernst celebrated its second re-opening after the British army left. During World War II, a part of the hotel was damaged and the owner family was very concerned to rebuild it as soon as the war was over. So, another re-opening took place after the end of World War II.

In 1986 a new wing was constructed, the "Neubau", with 29 rooms and suites. All renovations were done under the supervision of the interior designer Count Siegwart Pilati.  
In addition to French cuisine restaurant Hanse Stube, a second restaurant was opened in 2001: the taku, offers Asian cuisine in a contemporary atmosphere. In 2007, 45 rooms were turned into 35 more spacious rooms in the "Hanse Flügel". 

Excelsior Hotel Ernst is member of The Leading Hotels of the World and family Kracht-Roulet is still owner of the hotel. Since November 2012 Henning Matthiesen is the general manager of the hotel.

See also 
 Dom-Hotel, Cologne

References

External links 

 website 
 The Leading Hotels Of The World
 Selektion Deutscher Luxushotels

Landmarks in Cologne
Buildings and structures in Cologne
Hotels in Germany
Hotels established in 1863
Innenstadt, Cologne
Hotel buildings completed in 1863
1863 establishments in Prussia
The Leading Hotels of the World